Northern Songhay is the smaller of the two branches of the Songhay languages. It is a group of heavily Berber-influenced dialects spoken in scattered oases of the Sahara.

Languages
The nomadic varieties include Tihishit in central Niger around Mazababou (with two dialects, Tagdal and Tabarog) and Tadaksahak (or Dawsahak) spoken around Ménaka northeast of Gao (Heath 1999:xv). The sedentary varieties include Tasawaq in northern Niger (with two dialects, Ingelsi in In-Gall and the extinct Emghedeshie of Agadez) and Korandje far to the north, 150 km east of the Algerian–Moroccan border at Tabelbala.

Classification
The main outside influence on all of these except on Korandje is the Tamasheq language cluster. Korandje appears to be influenced more by Northern and Western Berber; in turn, the neighboring Northern Berber language Taznatit shows a few traces of Songhay influence. Since the Berber influence in these languages extends beyond the lexicon into the inflectional morphology, Northern Songhay are sometimes viewed as mixed languages (Alidou & Wolff 2001).

References

 Alidou, Husseina & Ekkehardt Wolff. 2001. "On the Non-Linear Ancestry of Tasawaq (Niger), or: How “Mixed” Can a Language Be?" in ed. Derek Nurse, Historical Language Contact in Africa, Köln: Rüdiger Köppe.
 Heath, Jeffrey. 1999. A grammar of Koyraboro (Koroboro) Senni: the Songhay of Gao. Köln: Köppe. 402 pp

Songhay languages